The Australian cruiserweight boxing championship is a title administered by the Australian National Boxing Federation (previously the Australian Boxing Federation) since its inauguration in 1981. The title is currently vacant.

List of champions
r – Champion relinquished title.
s – Champion stripped of title.

See also

List of Australian female boxing champions
List of Australian heavyweight boxing champions
List of Australian light heavyweight boxing champions
List of Australian super middleweight boxing champions
List of Australian middleweight boxing champions
List of Australian super welterweight boxing champions
List of Australian welterweight boxing champions
List of Australian super lightweight boxing champions
List of Australian lightweight boxing champions
List of Australian super featherweight boxing champions
List of Australian featherweight boxing champions
List of Australian bantamweight boxing champions
Boxing in Australia

References

External links
Championship history at BoxRec
Australian National Boxing Federation
Aus-Boxing Australian boxing news website

 
 
cruiserweight
Incomplete sports result lists
Incomplete sports lists